Aspose.Words  product family is a set of document processing APIs to create, read, edit, print, and save a document in most popular file formats such as Word, OpenDocument, Markdown, HTML, PDF, and many more. It was developed by Aspose Pty Ltd, who were founded in 2002. Aspose.Words library works started with .NET,. It then expanded to other languages including Java, C++, Python,  Android, SharePoint, SSRS and JasperReports development environments and also Aspose.Words provides a Cloud solution. The software is designed for developers. The library does not require office programs such as Microsoft Office or Microsoft Word or other software to be installed on the machine to work with the provided document formats.

Using Aspose.Words product family, users can also convert their documents to almost all popular document formats. In addition to the conversion function, Aspose.Words supports rendering, printing, reporting, mail merge options and advanced formatting for any document elements using the document object model (DOM).

Individual solutions
Aspose.Words product family offers individual solutions for most of the popular development environments:
 Aspose.Words for .NET
 Aspose.Words for Java
 Aspose.Words for C++
 Aspose.Words for Python
 Aspose.Words Cloud
 Aspose.Words for Android
 Aspose.Words for SharePoint
 Aspose.Words for SSRS
 Aspose.Words for JasperReports

Supported file formats
Aspose.Words supports the following file formats:

 DOC, DOCX, DOT, DOTX, DOCM, DOTM, Word 6.0 or Word 95
 XML, WordML, XAML, Flat OPC, Flat OPC Macro-Enabled, Flat OPC Template, Flat OPC Macro-Enabled Template
 HTML, MHTML, MD
 PDF
 EPUB, MOBI, CHM, AZW3
 SVG, TIFF, PNG, BMP, JPEG, GIF, EMF
 XPS, OpenXPS
 TXT
 RTF
 ODT, OTT
 PS
 PCL

Most of these formats are supported for both import and export. This means that users can download a document in almost any format and save it in another format from a wide list of available ones, thereby taking advantage of the document conversion feature.

Functionality

Loading, editing and saving 
Aspose.Words provides the ability to load and save documents in supported file formats.

Once loaded, the document can be edited. Users can change the document content using Aspose.Words API for working with text, tables, fields and graphic objects. Users can also add or remove watermarks or change document protect settings. All changes made can be saved in the document.

Converting documents 
Aspose.Words also provides the ability to convert documents from one file format to another. During the conversion process, users can make all the necessary changes in the document: load the document in one format, change the document, and then save the result in another format.

Rendering and printing 
Aspose.Words allows users to represent a document that is paginated or has the concept of pages. Such a document can also be printed – programmatically or using print preview dialogs.

Reporting 
Aspose.Words allows users to build different reports. These can be both reports based on templates and data from various data sources, and documents generated according to certain rules.

Cloud solution 
Aspose.Words Cloud is a REST API for creating, editing, converting, rendering and performing many other operations on documents in the cloud. This cloud solution supports all the popular functions of Aspose.Words product: conversion, comparison, splitting, protection of a document, mail merge operations, search and replace function, watermarking, and others.

Aspose.Words Cloud supports a cross platform command-line tool cURL, as well as popular SDKs: .NET, Java, Python, C++, PHP, Ruby, Node.js, Android.

Online applications 
Aspose.Words provides a number of online tools to try its functionality listed above. Each of the tools demonstrates a specific function, such as converting a document from one format to another, document comparison, splitting, translating, text recognition (OCR), and others. The list of such online tools, called applications, does not cover the full list of Aspose.Words features, but covers the most popular ones.

Competition 
Aspose.Words earliest offering Aspose.NET has been compared to many other products, demonstrating it's presence in the market for many years.

Licensing and subscription

Free Trial or Temporary License 
There are a few free license options:

 Free Trial – provides full functionality of the product, but inserts a watermark into the document when loading and saving, and limits the maximum document size to a few hundred paragraphs

 Temporary License – unlike the Free Trial, it has no document size limits, but has a 30-day usage limit

Purchased License 
Provides different paid license options based on the number of developers and deployment locations.

Metered Licensing 
Does not depend on the number of developers or deployment locations and allows users to be billed based on the use of API features.

History and timeline 
The first version of Aspose.Words was Aspose.Word 1.0 in December 2003. In 2005 the product was renamed to Aspose.Words.

Aspose.Words is currently released monthly.

See also
Apache POI
Office Open XML software

References

External links 
Aspose.Words official website
Aspose.Words public API 
Aspose.Words official documentation
Aspose.Words Cloud solution
Aspose.Words no code online applications

Application programming interfaces
Java platform
Java (programming language) libraries
Microsoft Office-related software